The 1962–63 daytime network television schedule for the three major English-language commercial broadcast networks in the United States covers the weekday daytime hours from September 1962 to August 1963.

Talk shows are highlighted in yellow, local programming is white, reruns of prime-time programming are orange, game shows are pink, soap operas are chartreuse, news programs are gold and all others are light blue. New series are highlighted in bold.

Monday-Friday

Saturday

Sunday

See also
1962-63 United States network television schedule (prime-time)
1962-63 United States network television schedule (late night)

Sources
Castleman & Podrazik, The TV Schedule Book, McGraw-Hill Paperbacks, 1984
TV schedules, NEW YORK TIMES, September 1962-September 1963 (microfilm)

References

United States weekday network television schedules
1962 in American television
1963 in American television